Calhoun is a neighborhood of New Berlin, Waukesha County, Wisconsin, United States.

History
A post office was established as Calhoun in 1882, and remained in operation until it was discontinued in 1918. The community was named for George E. Calhoun, the original owner of the town site.

References

Former populated places in Wisconsin
Populated places in Waukesha County, Wisconsin